Nostra Signora del Santissimo Sacramento e dei Santi Martiri Canadesi  ("Our Lady of the Blessed Sacrament and the Canadian Martyrs") is the Roman Catholic national church of Canada, located at 46, Via Giovanni Battista de Rossi, Rome.

Description
It is a titular church, since February 1965 when Maurice Roy became its first Cardinal-Priest. Patrick D'Rozario has held the title since 2016. It was made a parish church, served by the Congregation of Priests of the Most Holy Sacrament, by Pope Pius XII.  The Redemptorist Generalate is adjacent.

The church was in close proximity to the Canadian embassy, until the embassy re-located in 2007. Initially, the church was named Nostra Signora del Santissimo Sacramento (Our Lady of the Blessed Sacrament). but was re-consecrated in 1962.

The church was designed around 1950 by Bruno Apollini Ghetti. The facade mosaic is by Marko Ivan Rupnik. There is a small raccoon in the bottom right hand corner. The church contains a high altar designed by Francesco Nagni, ceramic decorations (including a fine crucifix) by Angelo Biancini. Biancini's terracotta ambo has panels depicting The Last Supper and the Madonna and Child.  The stained glass windows are by János Hajnal and Marcello Avenali.

Cardinal priests 
Pope Paul VI established as titular church on 25 February 1965.
Maurice Roy, Archbishop of Quebec, 25 February 1965 appointed–24 October 1985 died
Paul Grégoire, Archbishop of Montreal, 28 June 1988 appointed–30 October 1993 died
Jean-Claude Turcotte, Archbishop of Montreal, 26 November 1994 appointed–8 April 2015 died
Patrick D'Rozario, Archbishop of the Dhaka, 19 November 2016 appointed- present

Images

Popular culture
 Shortly after completion, Fellini shot a scene in the church for his film La Dolce Vita (1960), during which Bach's Toccata and Fugue in D minor is played on the church organ.

References

External links

Nyborg
Centro Aletti - Arte spirituale - Chiesa della Nostra Signora del SS. Sacramento e SS. Martiri Canadesi a Roma

Titular churches
National churches in Rome
Catholic Church in Canada
Roman Catholic churches completed in 1955
Rome Q. V Nomentano
1955 establishments in Italy
20th-century Roman Catholic church buildings in Italy